Anandapur is a village in Bankura I Sub District in Bankura district, West Bengal, India.

Demographics
According to 2011 census of India, the village has a population of 42; 22 are male and 20 female.

References

Villages in Bankura district